General elections were held in the United Principalities on 24 and 25 November 1864.

References

External links
LEGE din 2 iulie 1864 cu privire la alegeri

Romania
Parliamentary elections in Romania
1864 in Romania
Romania
Election and referendum articles with incomplete results